Golubinci is a village in Serbia. It is situated in the Stara Pazova municipality, in the Srem District, Vojvodina province. The village has a Serb ethnic majority and Croat minority and its population numbering 4,721 people (2011 census).

Name
The name of the settlement in Serbian is plural.

See also
List of places in Serbia
List of cities, towns and villages in Vojvodina

Populated places in Syrmia